The 1940 Washington gubernatorial election was held on November 5, 1940. Republican nominee Arthur B. Langlie narrowly defeated Democratic nominee Clarence Dill with 50.24% of the vote.

Primary elections
Primary elections were held on September 10, 1940.

Candidates 
Arthur B. Langlie, incumbent Mayor of Seattle
Clarence Dill, former United States Senator
Clarence D. Martin, incumbent Governor
Tom Smith
George H. Gannon
Frank Burns
J. Warren Kinney
Alexander Gabrielsen	
Marius Rasmussen
George Dana Linn

Results

General election

Candidates
Major party candidates
Arthur B. Langlie, Republican 
Clarence Dill, Democratic

Other candidates
John Brockway, Communist
P.J. Ater, Socialist Labor

Results

References

1940
Washington
Gubernatorial